"Pain Is So Close to Pleasure" is a song by Queen, included on their 1986 album A Kind of Magic, written by Freddie Mercury
and John Deacon, released in the USA and Canada, Germany and the Netherlands as the fourth and fifth single from that album respectively. 

The single reached #56 at the German charts and #43 on the Dutch charts. "Pain Is So Close to Pleasure" has more than 58,000 hits on Lastfm.

Background
The song began as a riff idea by Brian May, then Freddie Mercury and John Deacon turned it into a song, with Deacon playing rhythm guitar. The title also appears as a line in "One Year of Love". 

The version which appears on the single is a remix, rearranging much of the backing track from the original elements. The 12" single features an extended version of this remix, rather than an extended version of the track as it appears on the album.

Chart performance

Personnel
Freddie Mercury – vocals, piano, synthesizer, sampler
Brian May – lead guitar
Roger Taylor – drums
John Deacon – bass guitar, rhythm guitar, synthesizer, drum machine, sampler
Spike Edney - synthesizer

References

External links
Lyrics at Queen official website

1986 singles
Queen (band) songs
Rock ballads
Songs written by Freddie Mercury
Songs written by John Deacon
Song recordings produced by Reinhold Mack
EMI Records singles
Capitol Records singles
Hollywood Records singles
British soul songs